Ján Horecký (8 January 1920  - 11 August 2006) was a Slovak linguist.

In 1944 he graduated in Slovak and Latin language at the Slovak University in Bratislava (now Comenius University). After graduation, Horecký became a researcher at the Slovak Academy of Sciences.

In addition to study of the Slovak language, he also studied Czech, slovenčiny, Hungarian, Latin, Ancient Greek and various constructed languages. He was particularly interested in the Romani language, a topic he collaborated on with his daughter, the Indologist Anna Rácová.

Publications 

 Horecký, Ján: Základy slovenskej terminológie. Bratislava: SAV, 1956.
 Horecký, Ján: Základy jazykovedy. Bratislava: Slovenské pedagogické nakladateľstvo, 1978.
 Ondrus, Pavol – Horecký, Ján – Furdík, Juraj: Súčasný slovenský spisovný jazyk: Lexikológia. Bratislava: Slovenské pedagogické nakladateľstvo, 1980.
 Horecký, Ján: Spoločnosť a jazyk. Bratislava: Veda, 1982.
 Horecký, Ján: Slovenčina v našom živote. Bratislava: Slovenské pedagogické nakladateľstvo, 1988.
 Rácová, Anna – Horecký, Ján: Slovenská karpatská rómčina, Veda, vydavateľstvo SAV, 2000.

Awards 

 2000: Scientist of the Year, awarded by the Slovak Academy of Sciences
 2001: Pribina Cross, 1st class for contribution to Slovak science at culture, awarded by the President of Slovakia Rudolf Schuster
 Honorary doctorates from the University of Prešov and University of Ss. Cyril and Methodius

References

People from Stupava, Malacky District
Linguists from Slovakia
2006 deaths
1920 births
Comenius University alumni